Tetracha spixii is a species of tiger beetle that was described by Brullé in 1837. The species is common in Bolivia, Brazil, Ecuador, and Peru.

References

Beetles described in 1837
Beetles of South America
Taxa named by Gaspard Auguste Brullé
Cicindelidae